Edgar Mauricio Duck Núñez (born 25 July 1973) is a Mexican politician from the National Action Party. From 2006 to 2009 he served as Deputy of the LX Legislature of the Mexican Congress representing Veracruz, and previously served in the Congress of Veracruz.

References

1973 births
Living people
Politicians from Veracruz
National Action Party (Mexico) politicians
21st-century Mexican politicians
Members of the Congress of Veracruz
Deputies of the LX Legislature of Mexico
Members of the Chamber of Deputies (Mexico) for Veracruz